Gian Piero Gasperini (born 26 January 1958) is an Italian football manager and former player, who is currently the manager of Italian side Atalanta.

Playing career 
Gasperini entered the Juventus youth system at the age of 9; during his stay at the youth system, he won an Allievi Nazionali championship and was in the Primavera squad, which included Paolo Rossi and Sergio Brio, that placed runner-up in 1976 behind Lazio. After having played a handful of Coppa Italia matches with the first team, he was loaned to Reggiana and then sold to Serie B club Palermo in 1978. He stayed five seasons at Palermo, all in Serie B, but reached a Coppa Italia final in 1979, then lost to Juventus.

After two seasons with Cavese (Serie B) and Pistoiese (Serie C1), Gasperini moved to Pescara, where he finally gained his first opportunity to play in Serie A after the promotion in 1987. He made his Serie A debut in a home match against Pisa, ended in a 2–1 victory which featured a goal of his. In 1990, he left Pescara to join Salernitana, and retired in 1993 at the age of 35 after two seasons with Vis Pesaro.

Managerial career

Juventus (youth team) 
In 1994 Gasperini returned to Juventus's youth system, this time as a coach. He was initially coach of the Giovanissimi (U-14) for two years, followed by two other years with the Allievi (U-17). In 1998, he became the manager of the Primavera (U-20) squad.

Crotone 
In 2003, he left Juventus to become head coach of Serie C1 club Crotone, where he readily guided his team to promotion to Serie B via the play-offs. He stayed at Crotone for two more seasons in Serie B; he was sacked during the 2004–2005 season but appointed back soon later.

Genoa 

From 2006 he was head coach of ambitious club Genoa, and led his side to a promotion to Serie A in his first season with the rossoblu. In the 2008–09 season, Gasperini led Genoa to fifth place of Serie A, the highest placement for the team in 19 years, thus securing a UEFA Europa League spot, relaunching players like Diego Milito and Thiago Motta in a 3–4–3 formation and a particularly spectacular football style that was praised throughout Italy, so much so that José Mourinho, manager of Serie A champions Inter Milan, stated Gasperini was the coach who put him in greatest difficulty. However, a poor start in the 2010–11 season, with 11 points in 10 games despite popular signings such as Luca Toni, Rafinha, Miguel Veloso and Kakha Kaladze, caused Gasperini's dismissal from his coaching post on 8 November.

Inter Milan 
On 24 June 2011, Massimo Moratti confirmed that Gasperini would replace Leonardo as the manager of Inter Milan. However, on 21 September 2011, Gasperini was sacked after a dismal run of five winless games, including four defeats.

Gasperini began his spell at Inter with a 2–1 loss against crosstown rivals Milan in the 2011 Supercoppa Italiana. In the first Serie A league game, Inter were then surprised by a caretaker-headed Palermo in a 4–3 defeat in Sicily, then followed by a scoreless home draw with Roma.

A 1–0 home defeat to Trabzonspor in the Champions League made matters worse, and Moratti sacked Gasperini after a shock 3–1 defeat to Serie A newcomers Novara.

Palermo 
On 16 September 2012, Gasperini was announced as the new manager of Palermo, a former team of his as a player, taking over from Giuseppe Sannino.

On 4 February 2013, he was dismissed from his post following a 2–1 loss at home to Atalanta.

On 24 February 2013, Gasperini was rehired as the Palermo manager, replacing Alberto Malesani after three games in charge.
On 11 March 2013, Gasperini was again removed from the post, this time by Giuseppe Sannino.

Return to Genoa 
On 29 September 2013, Genoa announced to have rehired Gasperini after almost three years since his previous spell ended.

Atalanta 
On 14 June 2016, Gasperini was appointed manager of Atalanta. During his term at the team, Gasperini turned Atalanta from a club with the goal of avoiding Serie B relegation into a team fighting for Serie A dominance and constantly participating in European competitions. His first season in charge turned out to have a difficult start, Gasperini being on the verge of sacking after 5 rounds which saw Atalanta in the penultimate place after a 0–1 home defeat to Palermo. However, from there on, the team's results steadily improved, leading them to beat Inter, Roma and Napoli, with a streak of 6 consecutive victories in Serie A leaving them in 6th place during the winter break. Atalanta continued to be the season's surprise package and finished fourth in Serie A, thus qualifying to the UEFA Europa League.

The following season, returning to Europe after 26 years of absence, Atalanta managed to win the Europa League group with Lyon, Everton and Apollon Limassol undefeated to progress to the round of 16, where they were eliminated by Borussia Dortmund after a 1–1 home draw and a 2–3 away loss in Germany. In Serie A, they managed a 7th place finish, thus earning another UEFA Europa League qualification, this time in the second qualifying round, while in the Coppa Italia they progressed to the semi-finals, where they were eliminated by Juventus.

On 26 May 2019, Atalanta finished third in Serie A during the 2018–19 season, and qualified to the UEFA Champions League for the first time in their history. Atalanta also reached the final of the 2018–19 Coppa Italia; however they lost 2–0 against Lazio.

On 9 September 2019, Atalanta coach Gian Piero Gasperini was made an honorary citizen of Bergamo. Atalanta qualified to the round of 16 of the Champions League for the first time after finishing in second place in the group with Manchester City, Shakhtar Donetsk and Dinamo Zagreb. Gasperini's first match in the Champions League knockout rounds ended in a 4–1 home win against Valencia. Atalanta progressed to the quarter-finals following a 4–3 away win over Valencia in the second leg on 10 March 2020, giving them an 8–4 aggregate victory. However, they were eliminated by Paris Saint-Germain in the quarter-finals following a 1–2 defeat.

Style of management 
Tactically, Gasperini is known for using a fluid 3–4–3 formation and a spectacular high-risk hyper-offensive-minded possession-based system, which relies on the versatility of his midfielders and front line. His team's playing style places more focus on scoring goals, off-the-ball movement and quick, short passes on the ground, and less focus on long balls and the defensive aspect of the game. As such, at times his trademark 3–4–3 system resembles a 3–4–1–2, 3–2–4–1, 3–5–2, or 3–4–2–1 formation, with energetic overlapping attacking wing-backs in lieu of wide midfielders, that provide width along the flanks and push up the pitch when going forward. He has also been known to use a 4–3–3 or 4–2–3–1 on occasion. His teams are known for playing a high defensive line and for being very compact defensively, with little distance between the attack and the defence. During the 1990s, Gasperini's tactical philosophy and teams' playing styles was inspired by Dutch football, namely Louis van Gaal's Ajax side, rather than Arrigo Sacchi's 4–4–2 system. When defending off the ball, his teams are also known for the use of heavy pressing, but also apply elements of fluid man-marking across the entire pitch and often switch to a 5–4–1 formation defensively. Gasperini favours using hard-working and highly physical two-way players in midfield rather than a deep-lying playmaker, but also quick, elusive, even smaller but creative players upfront, in order to implement his system effectively; he has also been known to use a larger and more physical centre-forward upfront on occasion, who is good in the air. Despite the acclaim he has garnered due to his offensive playing style, which has led him to obtain successful results with smaller teams, he has also drawn criticism for his unbalanced approach, and for his team's tendency to concede goals as well as scoring them. As such, certain pundits have questioned whether his system would be equally effective with larger teams.

Managerial statistics

Honours

Club
Atalanta
Coppa Italia runner-up: 2018–19, 2020–21

Individual
Serie A Coach of the Year: 2019, 2020
Gazzetta Sports Awards Coach of the Year: 2017
Panchina d'Oro: 2019, 2020
Serie A Coach of the Month: November 2021

References

External links

Profile at the Atalanta B.C. website

1958 births
Living people
People from Grugliasco
Footballers from Turin
Italian footballers
Association football midfielders
Juventus F.C. players
A.C. Reggiana 1919 players
Palermo F.C. players
Cavese 1919 players
U.S. Pistoiese 1921 players
Delfino Pescara 1936 players
U.S. Salernitana 1919 players
Vis Pesaro dal 1898 players
Serie A players
Serie B players
Italian football managers
Juventus F.C. non-playing staff
F.C. Crotone managers
Genoa C.F.C. managers
Inter Milan managers
Palermo F.C. managers
Atalanta B.C. managers
Serie C managers
Serie B managers
Serie A managers